Herbert Parsons (October 28, 1869 – September 16, 1925) was a U.S. Representative from New York.

Early life
Parsons was born in New York City on October 28, 1869.  He was the son of John Edward Parsons, a former president of the New York City Bar Association, and Mary Dumesnil McIlvaine.

Parsons attended private schools in New York City, St. Paul's School, Concord, New Hampshire, Yale University, the University of Berlin, Harvard Law School, and was graduated from Yale University in 1890.

Career
He was admitted to the bar in 1894 and commenced practice in New York City.
He served as member of the board of aldermen of New York City in 1900–1904.

He was elected as a Republican to the Fifty-ninth, Sixtieth, and Sixty-first Congresses (March 4, 1905 – March 3, 1911). A 1910 run for reelection to the Sixty-second Congress was unsuccessful, and Parsons resumed the practice of law in New York City.

He served as delegate to all Republican New York State conventions from 1904 to 1920, and to the Republican National Conventions in 1908, 1912, 1916, and 1920. During the First World War he served on the general staff of the American Expeditionary Forces.

Personal life
Parsons was married to Elsie Worthington Clews, an anthropologist and folklorist of the indigenous people of the American Southwest.  She was the daughter of financier and author Henry Clews. They were married in Newport, Rhode Island on September 1, 1900. Together, they were the parents of:

 Elsie "Lissa" Parsons (b. 1901)
 John Edward Parsons (b. 1903)
 Herbert Parsons (b. 1909)
 Henry McIlvaine "Mac" Parsons (1911–2004), a noted behavioral psychologist.

Parsons died in Pittsfield, Massachusetts, September 16, 1925. He was interred in Lenox Cemetery.

Sources

References

External links
 Cartoon of the Day (November 16, 1907), HarpWeek

1869 births
1925 deaths
Harvard Law School alumni
Yale University alumni
Republican Party members of the United States House of Representatives from New York (state)